The 2022 European Artistic Roller Skating Championships were held in Andorra la Vella, Andorra from August 31 – September 10, 2022. Jointly organized by the Federació Andorrana de Patinatge and Real Federación Española de Patinaje, the 11-days championship took place at the Poliesportiu d'Andorra with 5,000-seats capacity.

Venue

Participating nations
17 nations entered the competition.

Medallists

Medal table

References

External links 
Complete book results
Live streaming

European 2022
Artistic Roller Skating European Championships
Artistic Roller Skating European Championships
International sports competitions hosted by Andorra
European Artistic Roller Skating Championships